The 2022–23 Southeastern Louisiana Lions basketball team represented Southeastern Louisiana University in the 2022–23 NCAA Division I men's basketball season. The Lions, led by fourth-year head coach David Kiefer, played their home games at the University Center in Hammond, Louisiana as members of the Southland Conference.

Previous season
The Lions finished the 2021–22 season 19–15, 10–4 in Southland play to finish tied for second place. They defeated New Orleans in the semifinals of the Southland tournament, before falling to Texas A&M–Corpus Christi in the championship game. They were invited to The Basketball Classic, where they would lose to South Alabama in the first round.

Preseason polls

Southland Conference Poll
The Southland Conference released its preseason poll on October 25, 2022. Receiving 105 votes overall, the Lions were picked to finish fourth in the conference.

Preseason All Conference
No Lions were selected as members of a Preseason all conference team.

Roster

Schedule and results

|-
!colspan=12 style=|Regular season

|-
!colspan=12 style=| Southland Tournament

Source

See also
2022–23 Southeastern Louisiana Lady Lions basketball team

References

Southeastern Louisiana
Southeastern Louisiana Lions basketball seasons
Southeastern Louisiana Lions basketball
Southeastern Louisiana Lions basketball